Rolf Franke (born 7 April 1967) is a Dutch retired basketball player and current coach. As a player, Franke played for multiple clubs in the Netherlands and he represented the Dutch national basketball team in 60 games as well.

He is the son of Wim Franke and father of Yannick Franke, both basketball players as well.

Professional career
As a player, Franke won the Dutch Eredivisie title eight times, while winning the NBB Cup four times.

Coaching career

ZZ Leiden
On 11 June 2018, Franke signed a one-year contract to become the head coach of ZZ Leiden. On 31 March 2019, Franke won the NBB Cup with Leiden, the club's first trophy since 2013. On 24 April 2019, it was announced that Franke won the DBL Coach of the Year.

On 5 July 2019, Leiden announced that Franke was returning for a second season. After the 2019–20 season was cancelled early due to the COVID-19 pandemic, Leiden decided not to extend Franke's contract.

Honours

As player
Eredivisie (8): 1989, 1990, 1991, 1992, 1993, 1994 1995, 1997, 1999

As coach
Leiden
NBB Cup: 2018–19
DBL Coach of the Year: 2018–19

References

1967 births
Dutch Basketball League players
Dutch men's basketball players
Dutch basketball coaches
Zorg en Zekerheid Leiden coaches
Heroes Den Bosch players
Amsterdam Basketball players
Den Helder Kings players
Living people
Forwards (basketball)